Stuart Hibberd (born 11 October 1961) is an English former footballer who made 43 appearances in the Football League playing for Lincoln City. A midfielder, he also played in the Alliance Premier League for Boston United and for Northern Counties East League club Alfreton Town.

References

1961 births
Living people
Footballers from Sheffield
English footballers
Association football midfielders
Lincoln City F.C. players
Boston United F.C. players
Alfreton Town F.C. players
English Football League players
National League (English football) players